Hell Drivers (1957) is a British film noir crime drama film directed by Cy Endfield and starring Stanley Baker, Herbert Lom, Peggy Cummins and Patrick McGoohan. The film was produced by the Rank Organisation and Aqua Film Productions. The film revolves around a recently released convict who takes a driver's job at a haulage company.

Plot
Having spent time abroad, Tom Yately (Stanley Baker) seeks work as a truck driver with Hawletts, a transport company. Mr. Cartley (William Hartnell), the depot manager, informs Tom that his drivers convey their ten-ton loads of gravel fast over bad roads. They are expected to deliver a minimum of twelve loads a day; if a driver falls behind, he is fired. Each run is  round-trip; the top driver makes eighteen runs a day. Tom goes on a trial run with the depot mechanic, in truck no. 13. He narrowly avoids colliding head-on with two other Hawletts trucks speeding the other way.

Cartley hires Tom, and he's assigned truck 13. Tom meets the other drivers, including Irishman Red (Patrick McGoohan), the foreman and head driver. Lodging at the same house as various other drivers, Tom is befriended by Gino (Herbert Lom), an Italian driver who is in love with Lucy (Peggy Cummins), Cartley's secretary. Red offers a £250 gold cigarette case to anyone who can make more runs than him in a day, and Tom is determined to try; however, he soon learns that Red has kept his place at the top by taking a dangerous shortcut that none of the other drivers are willing to risk.

One evening, the drivers go to a dance at a nearby hall and start a fight. When the police are called, Tom flees the scene. Red calls him a coward and, from then on, the other drivers (except Gino) turn on Tom, bullying him incessantly, impeding his runs, and calling him "yellow belly". Despite this, Tom doesn't retaliate.

Tom visits his brother Jimmy (David McCallum) and mother (Beatrice Varley) in their tobacconist's shop. His mother refuses to accept money from Tom, blaming him for Jimmy's life-changing leg injury that requires him to use crutches.

When the drivers collect their pay packets, Tom realises he's been underpaid. A gleeful Red informs Tom his wages were docked to replace equipment damaged as a result of the drivers' bullying. A fistfight ensues, in which Tom beats Red. Gino offers to switch truck numbers with Tom the next day, so that the others can unwittingly harass Gino and therefore help Tom to win the cigarette case.

That night, Lucy breaks up with Gino. Expressing her feelings for Tom while he performs a vehicle check, Tom confesses that he hadn't actually been abroad but was instead serving a year-long prison sentence. Lucy drops off Tom at the drivers' digs, both unaware that Gino has seen them from his bedroom window.

The next day, Tom purchases a one-way train ticket to London. Lucy rushes into the waiting room and tells him that Gino has been seriously injured in a crash. Distraught, they rush to the hospital. While they wait anxiously outside Gino's room, Lucy tells Tom that Cartley and Red have been scamming money by hiring five fewer drivers than the company pays for and pocketing the difference. They're interrupted by a doctor, who informs them Gino is dying. Gino had switched the truck numbers as arranged, and tells Tom "I threw them off like we planned, for you to win. Crazy. You don't even come." Tom asks him if it was Red who caused his crash, but Gino dies without answering.

Tom returns to the depot and confronts Cartley. He tells him that Gino has died and he knows why, and that he knows about the scam. Cartley offers him a share of the stolen money and Red's place in truck no. 1. Tom is having none of it, but takes truck no. 1 to pick up a load. When Red turns up, he forces Cartley to join him in what they think is truck no. 3 and sets out to silence Tom. Red guesses that Tom will take the dangerous shortcut through the quarry, and they lie in wait there. When Tom appears with his truck full of ballast, Red sideswipes him several times, finally forcing him off the road and onto the edge of the quarry, where the truck dangles precariously, with Tom knocked unconscious. But the brakes on Red's truck, which Red finally realises is Tom's no. 13, fail and he and Cartley drive off the edge and are killed. Tom wakes up and escapes just before his own truck tumbles into the quarry. Lucy (who followed them in a jeep) runs to him.

Cast

 Stanley Baker as Tom Yately, driver, truck 13
 Herbert Lom as Gino Rossi, driver, truck 3
 Peggy Cummins as Lucy
 Patrick McGoohan as G. "Red" Redman, driver, truck 1
 William Hartnell as Cartley, the depot manager
 Wilfrid Lawson as Ed, Hawlett's mechanic 
 Sid James as Dusty, driver, truck 22
 Jill Ireland as Jill, 'Pull Inn' waitress 
 Alfie Bass as Tinker, driver, truck 11
 Gordon Jackson as Scottie, driver, truck 7
 David McCallum as Jimmy Yately, Tom's brother 
 Sean Connery as Johnny Kates, driver, truck 19
 Wensley Pithey as Pop, driver, truck 4
 George Murcell as Tub, driver, truck 2
 Marjorie Rhodes as Ma West, landlady 
 Vera Day as Blonde at dance
 Beatrice Varley as Mrs. Yately, Tom's mother
 Robin Bailey as Hawlett's assistant manager 
 John Miller
 Jerry Stovin as Chick Keithley 
 John Horsley as Doctor attending Gino 
 Marianne Stone as Nurse attending Gino 
 Ronald Clarke as Barber Joe, driver, truck 6
 Charles Lamb as Cafe owner (uncredited) 
 Hal Osmond as Station ticket clerk (uncredited)
 Ben Williams as Harry, Hawlett's gateman (uncredited)
 Ian Wilson as Gibson, Hawlett's paymaster (uncredited)

Actors
Hell Drivers is an early film for several actors who later developed high profile careers. It provided early appearances for Jill Ireland and David McCallum, who met and married during the film's production. It featured Danger Man and The Prisoner actor Patrick McGoohan, and was the third film role for Sean Connery. William Hartnell was the first actor to play the role of The Doctor in the BBC's Doctor Who; Gordon Jackson appeared as George Cowley in The Professionals and the butler Hudson in ITV's Upstairs, Downstairs. Sid James was a regular supporting actor in British films at the time and appeared in most of the Carry On series. Herbert Lom starred in the ABC Weekend TV series The Human Jungle before playing the hapless Commissioner Dreyfus in The Pink Panther film franchise. Cy Endfield directed Stanley Baker in Zulu. Others including Robin Bailey, Charles Lamb, John Horsley and Wensley Pithey featured regularly in British films and television thereafter. Long-established actor Wilfrid Lawson also made an appearance. In 1966, he co-starred with Patrick McGoohan in the final black-and-white episode of Danger Man, "Not So Jolly Roger".

Production 
Filming started 31 December 1956.

The character of Yately comes from Blaenllechau in the Rhondda, near actor Stanley Baker's birthplace of Ferndale.

Footage of a Hawlett's lorry going over the edge of a quarry was reused in "The Heiress" episode of the Rank Organisation television series Interpol Calling.

The vehicles used in the film were the Dodge 100 "Kew" parrot-nosed truck, with tipper body. They were lent for filming by W W Drinkwater of Willesden, North London.

Home media
The film was released on DVD, with various extras, in 2007 by Network Distributing in an anamorphically enhanced ratio of 1.77:1. A little of the original 1.96:1 VistaVision (70mm) image is cropped at the sides, which is just noticeable in a few shots.

On 20 March 2017, Network Distributing issued a Blu-ray, with the film restored by the BFI, and included a swathe of special features.

Notes

External links
 
 
 
 
 Production photos

1957 films
1957 drama films
British drama films
Trucker films
Films directed by Cy Endfield
Films shot at Pinewood Studios
1950s English-language films
1950s British films